Santry River (formerly Skillings Glas) is a fairly small river on the north side of Dublin city, one of the forty or so watercourses monitored by Dublin City Council.

Course

The Santry River rises at an elevation of c. 80m, in the semi-rural areas of Harristown and Dubber in the part of County Dublin now administered by Fingal County Council, near the village of St. Margaret's and Dublin Airport.  The lead branch can be found at the end of a small lane in the former Harristown Demesne, now cut off by new road development.  The river then flows along to the south of Dublin Airport (from which some tributary streams enter it), near the new Dublin Bus Harristown depot.  With the Dubber branch, it passes for most of its upper course out in the open, flowing through Sillogue Public Golf Course and then more of Ballymun; up to this point, the main channel is called Quinn's River.

The river traverses Santry, where it forms a major feature of the Santry Demesne, with small lakes within what is now the public park.  In Coolock, the river forms a central feature in the valley which cuts through the district, and features a pond, sometimes Coolock Lake, and a small cascade, running past the Stardust Memorial Park, and through the grounds of Cadbury's Ireland, where there is an EPA monitoring station and a tumulus on its banks.

The Santry River then enters Raheny near the beginning of Tonlegee Road, flowing alongside the Edenmore lands, past St. Joseph's Hospital, through the village centre, alongside the grounds of Manor House School, and then, with two areas of culverting, at the beginning and end of the former Bettyglen Estate, reaches the sea, where its mouth forms part of the eastern "lagoon" behind North Bull Island, and the flow enters Sutton Creek.  The lower stretch of the river is occasionally noted as "Raheny River."

Drainage link from Naniken River
The dotted line on the above sketch is an artificial link made by Dublin Corporation between the Santry River and the Naniken River, to reduce the flow of the latter and to allow handling of any flooding in either watercourse. It runs at the western end of Kilmore West in Coolock.

Nearby catchments

In its upper reaches, the Santry drainage basin is bordered by that of the Wad River, which comes to the sea at the city end of Clontarf, and that of the Mayne River system, which concludes at Baldoyle Bay.  Citywards, the Naniken basin lies closer to the city, while to the north and east two small streams drain parts of Edenmore and Raheny; these two watercourses are the Fox Stream, reaching the sea at the end of Fox's Lane, and the Blackbanks Stream, with its mouth where Howth Road and the James Larkin Road meet.

Studies
As part of the management of the river, the Santry river is one of the third tier rivers being numerically mapped within the Greater Dublin Strategic Drainage Study, with floodplain hydraulics computed (the other rivers being the Carrickmines, Deansgrange or Kill of the Grange, Poddle, Camac, Finglas and Mayne, along with one of the two second-tier waterways, the Tolka).

Incidents
The Santry river has been noted for pollution incidents over the years, with industrial effluent and building material the most common causes (some of the latter once caused the main pond by the Stardust Memorial to be drained and reformed). There is a motorbike in the river in Stardust Memorial Park.

References

Bibliography

 Dublin, Dublin City Council, Raheny Branch Library: Local History File
 Dublin, Dublin Corporation and contractors, 2002 et seq: The Greater Dublin Strategic Drainage Study.

Rivers of Dublin (city)
Coolock
Raheny